Wyoming Highway 113 (WYO 113) is a  east-west Wyoming State Road located in southwestern Crook County north of Moorcroft that provides travel to Pine Haven and Keyhole State Park that surrounds the Keyhole reservoir.

Route description
Mileposts along WYO 113 increase from west to east. Milepost 10.00 (0.00) is at US 14 and the highway ends at Milepost 16.61 (6.61)

Major intersections

References

External links 

Wyoming State Routes 100-199
WYO 113 - US 14 to Pine Haven
Pine Haven, WY website

Transportation in Crook County, Wyoming
113